The 1981–82 Milwaukee Bucks season was the 14th season for the Bucks.

Draft picks

Roster

Regular season

Season Standings

z = clinched division title
y = clinched division title
x = clinched playoff spot

Record vs. opponents

Game log

|-style="background:#fcc;"
| 1 || October 30, 1981 || @ Detroit
| L 113–118
|Sidney Moncrief (22)
|Mickey Johnson (10)
|Quinn Buckner (8)
| Pontiac Silverdome
| 0-1
|-style="background:#bbffbb;"
| 2 || October 31, 1981 || Boston
| W 119–103
|Sidney Moncrief (29)
|Harvey Catchings, Mickey Johnson (10)
|
| MECCA Arena
| 1–1

|-style="background:#bbffbb;"
| 3 || November 5, 1981 || Washington
| W 98–90
|Brian Winters (25)
|Mickey Johnson (11)
|
| MECCA Arena
| 2–1
|-style="background:#bbffbb;"
| 4 || November 7, 1981 || San Diego
| W 105–102
|Brian Winters (22)
|
|
| MECCA Arena
| 3–1
|-style="background:#fcc;"
| 5 || November 10, 1981 || @ Atlanta
| L 83—94
|Mickey Johnson (20)
|
|
| The Omni
| 3–2
|-style="background:#bbffbb;"
| 6 || November 11, 1981 || @ New Jersey
| W 100—88
|Bob Lanier (20)
|
|
| Brendan Byrne Arena
| 4–2
|-style="background:#bbffbb;"
| 7 || November 13, 1981 || New York
| W 105–102
|Quinn Buckner (21)
|
|
| MECCA Arena
| 5–2
|-style="background:#bbffbb;"
| 8 || November 15, 1981 || Cleveland
| W 98–96
|Sidney Moncrief (28)
|
|
| MECCA Arena
| 6–2
|-style="background:#bbffbb;"
| 9 || November 17, 1981 || @ Washington
| W 99—95
|
|
|
| Capital Centre
| 7–2
|-style="background:#fcc;"
| 10 || November 18, 1981 || @ Philadelphia
| L 100—102
|
|
|
| The Spectrum
| 7–3
|-style="background:#fcc;"
| 11 || November 20, 1981 || @ Boston
| L 89–112
|
|
|
| Boston Garden
| 7–4
|-style="background:#fcc;"
| 12 || November 21, 1981 || @ New York
| L 112—118
|
|
|
| Madison Square Garden
| 7–5
|-style="background:#bbffbb;"
| 13 || November 24, 1981 || Detroit
| W 103–95
|
|
|
| MECCA Arena
| 8–5
|-style="background:#fcc;"
| 14 || November 27, 1981 || Golden State
| L 96–113
|
|
|
| MECCA Arena
| 8–6
|-style="background:#bbffbb;"
| 15 || November 29, 1981 || San Antonio
| W 105–89
|
|
|
| MECCA Arena
| 9–6

|-style="background:#bbffbb;"
| 16 || December 1, 1981 || @ Cleveland
| W 126—110
|Sidney Moncrief (39)
|
|
| Coliseum at Richfield
| 10–6
|-style="background:#bbffbb;"
| 17 || December 4, 1981 || Atlanta
| W 97–80
|
|
|
| MECCA Arena
| 11–6
|-style="background:#bbffbb;"
| 18 || December 5, 1981 || @ Detroit
| W 111–108
|
|
|
| Pontiac Silverdome
| 12-6
|-style="background:#bbffbb;"
| 19 || December 9, 1981 || Houston
| W 89–83
|
|
|
| MECCA Arena
| 13–6
|-style="background:#bbffbb;"
| 20 || December 11, 1981 || Indiana
| W 103–100 OT
|
|
|
| MECCA Arena
| 14–6
|-style="background:#bbffbb;"
| 21 || December 12, 1981 || @ New York
| W 104—86
|
|
|
| Madison Square Garden
| 15–6
|-style="background:#bbffbb;"
| 22 || December 13, 1981 || Philadelphia
| W 127–108
|
|
|
| MECCA Arena
| 16–6
|-style="background:#bbffbb;"
| 23 || December 15, 1981 || @ Indiana
| W 104–96
|
|
|
| Market Square Arena
| 17-6
|-style="background:#fcc;"
| 24 || December 18, 1981 || New Jersey
| L 88–100
|
|
|
| MECCA Arena
| 17–7
|-style="background:#fcc;"
| 25 || December 22, 1981 || Kansas City
| L 101–106
|
|
|
| MECCA Arena
| 17–8
|-style="background:#bbffbb;"
| 26 || December 26, 1981 || @ Cleveland
| W 109—102
|
|
|
| Coliseum at Richfield
| 18–8
|-style="background:#bbffbb;"
| 27 || December 27, 1981 || Chicago
| W 108–96
|
|
|
| MECCA Arena
| 19–8

|-style="background:#fcc;"
| 39 || January 20, 1982 || @ Dallas
| L 104–109
|
|
|
| Reunion Arena
| 26–13
|-style="background:#bbffbb;"
| 42 || January 26, 1982 || @ Los Angeles
| W 96–94
|Marques Johnson (20)
|
|
| The Forum
| 28–14
|-style="background:#bbffbb;"
| 43 || January 28, 1982 || @ Utah
| W 119–101
|
|
|
| Salt Palace
| 29–14

|-style="background:#bbffbb;"
| 44 || February 3, 1982 || Chicago
| W 113–98
|Brian Winters (25)
|
|
| MECCA Arena
| 30–14
|-style="background:#bbffbb;"
| 45 || February 5, 1982 || Dallas
| W 117–92
|Sidney Moncrief, Brian Winters (19)
|
|
| MECCA Arena
| 31–14
|-style="background:#bbffbb;"
| 46 || February 7, 1982 || Phoenix
| W 107–92
|Scott May, Brian Winters (32)
|
|
| MECCA Arena
| 32–14

|-style="background:#fcc;"
| 59 || March 6, 1982 || @ San Antonio
| L 166–171 3OT
|
|
|
| HemisFair Arena
| 42–17
|-style="background:#fcc;"
| 63 || March 12, 1982 || Seattle
| L 110–112
|
|
|
| MECCA Arena
| 42–21
|-style="background:#bbffbb;"
| 64 || March 14, 1982 || Utah
| W 129–100
|
|
|
| MECCA Arena
| 43–21

Playoffs

|- align="center" bgcolor="#ffcccc"
| 1
| April 25
| @ Philadelphia
| L 122–125
| Mickey Johnson (28)
| Marques Johnson (7)
| Brian Winters (5)
| Spectrum10,086
| 0–1
|- align="center" bgcolor="#ffcccc"
| 2
| April 28
| @ Philadelphia
| L 108–120
| Brian Winters (21)
| Bob Lanier (11)
| Winters, May (5)
| Spectrum14,716
| 0–2
|- align="center" bgcolor="#ccffcc"
| 3
| May 1
| Philadelphia
| W 92–91
| Mickey Johnson (21)
| Marques Johnson (11)
| Marques Johnson (7)
| MECCA Arena11,052
| 1–2
|- align="center" bgcolor="#ffcccc"
| 4
| May 2
| Philadelphia
| L 93–100
| Marques Johnson (23)
| Mickey Johnson, Moncrief (7)
| Mickey Johnson (7)
| MECCA Arena11,052
| 1–3
|- align="center" bgcolor="#ccffcc"
| 5
| May 5
| @ Philadelphia
| W 110–98
| Bob Lanier (27)
| Alton Lister (11)
| Brian Winters (7)
| Spectrum16,668
| 2–3
|- align="center" bgcolor="#ffcccc"
| 6
| May 7
| Philadelphia
| L 90–102
| Bob Lanier (19)
| Bob Lanier (10)
| Brian Winters (6)
| MECCA Arena11,052
| 2–4
|-

Player statistics

Player statistics source:

Season

Playoffs

Awards and Records
 Sidney Moncrief, All-NBA Second Team
 Sidney Moncrief, NBA All-Defensive Second Team
 Quinn Buckner, NBA All-Defensive Second Team

Transactions

Free agents

References

 Bucks on Database Basketball
 Bucks on Basketball Reference

Milwaukee Bucks seasons
Mil
Milwaukee Bucks
Milwaukee Bucks